Ahmet Kaşif (born 1950) is a Turkish Cypriot politician.  He is a member of the Assembly of the Republic from Gazimağusa, and he is a member of the National Unity Party. He has been a member of the Assembly since 1990. He ran for the presidency of his party against İrsen Küçük in 2012. He served as the Minister of Health between 2009 and 2012, until when he was removed from his position by the prime minister Küçük.

He was born in the village of Nergizli in 1950 and studied medicine at the Istanbul University.

References 

1950 births
Living people
Members of the Assembly of the Republic (Northern Cyprus)
Istanbul University Faculty of Medicine alumni
National Unity Party (Northern Cyprus) politicians
Government ministers of Northern Cyprus
People from Famagusta District
Turkish Cypriot expatriates in Turkey